This is a list of organizations and societies in psychology.



A
Academy for Eating Disorders
Academy of Counseling Psychology
Aelation Lifelong Learning Research Council
American Academy of Child and Adolescent Psychiatry
American Academy of Clinical Neuropsychology
American Academy of Psychiatry and the Law
American Academy of Psychoanalysis and Dynamic Psychiatry
American Association of Community Psychiatrists
American Association of Geriatric Psychiatry
American Group Psychotherapy Association 
American Psychiatric Association 
American Psychiatric Nurses Association
American Psychoanalytic Association
American Psychological Association
Archives of the History of American Psychology
Associated Counsellors & Psychologists NSW
Association for Advancement of Behavior Therapy
Association for Behavior Analysis International
Association for Child and Adolescent Mental Health
Association for College Psychiatry
Association for Contextual Behavioral Science
Association for the Scientific Study of Consciousness
Association for Psychological Science
Association for Rational Emotive Behaviour Therapy
Association for Transpersonal Psychology
Association of Black Psychologists
Anxiety and Depression Association of America
Australian Psychological Society
Australian Psychologists Association
Australian Psychology Accreditation Council

B
Beat
The Behavior Analyst Certification Board
Behavior Genetics Association
Belgian Psychological Association
B. F. Skinner Foundation
British Association for Behavioural and Cognitive Psychotherapies
British Psychoanalytical Society
British Psychological Society
Buenos Aires Psychoanalytic Association

C
Canadian Psychological Association
Cambridge Center for Behavioral Studies

D

E

Environmental Design Research Association
European Academy of Occupational Health Psychology
 European Association of Counselling Psychology
European Federation of Psychologists' Associations (EFPA)
European Federation of Psychology Students' Associations (EFPSA)
European Federation of Psychology Teachers' Associations
European Health Psychology Society
Experimental Psychology Society

F
FABBS Foundation
Federation of Associations in Behavioral & Brain Sciences
Finnish Psychological Society

G
German Psychological Association
Goy Psychological Center

H
Human Factors and Ergonomics Society
Houston Psychological Association
 Hong Kong Association of Doctors in Clinical Psychology (HKADCP)
Hong Kong Psychological Society

I
Institute of Professional Psychologists
International Association for Cross-Cultural Psychology  
International Association of Applied Psychology
International Council of Psychologists
International Early Psychosis Association
International Literature and Psychology Conference
International Psychoanalytic Association
International School Psychology Association
International Society for Comparative Psychology
International Society for the Study of Behavioural Development
International Society for the Study of Individual Differences
International Society for Intelligence Research
International Society for Research on Aggression
International Society of Political Psychology
International Society of the Rorschach and Projective Methods
International Society on Infant Studies
International Transpersonal Association
International Union of Psychological Science
International Institute for the Advanced Studies of Psychotherapy and Applied Mental Health

J

K

L
 LivingWorks, a suicide prevention organization

M
Massachusetts General Hospital Psychiatry Academy
Minnesota Association For Children's Mental Health

N
National Association of School Psychologists
North American Society of Adlerian Psychology

O
OPIFER, Organizzazione di Psicoanalisti Italiani Federazione e Registro
OUPS, Open University Psychological Society

P
Plega: Sport Psychology
Psi Chi, National Honor Society in Psychology
Psychonomic Society
Psychological Society of Ireland
Psychologist's Federation of Venezuela

R
Romanian Association for Cognitive and Behavioral Psychotherapies

S
Singapore Psychological Society
Society of Clinical Child & Adolescent Psychology
Society for Industrial and Organizational Psychology (SIOP)
Society for Occupational Health Psychology
Society for Personality Assessment
Society for Research in Child Development
Society for Research on Adolescence
Swedish Psychological Society
Society for Media Psychology and Technology

T
Transpersonal Relationship Growth
±

U

V

W
World Federation for Mental Health

X

Y

Z

References

Organizations
 
Psychology